Kutna is a former village in eastern Slovenia in the Municipality of Trebnje. It is now part of the village of Replje. It is part of the traditional region of Lower Carniola and is now included in the Southeast Slovenia Statistical Region.

Geography
Kutna is located south of the village center of Replje along a side road to Vrtače. It stands on a small hill with many sinkholes.

Name
Kutna was attested in historical sources as Khuting in 1385 and Kutina in 1505.

History
Kutna was annexed by Replje in 1953, ending its existence as a separate settlement.

References

External links
Kutna on Geopedia

Populated places in the Municipality of Trebnje
Former settlements in Slovenia